A honey super is a part of a commercial or other managed (such as by a hobbyist) beehive that is used to collect honey.  The most common variety is the "Illinois" or "medium" super with a depth of 6 inches, in the length and width dimensions of a Langstroth hive.

A honey super consists of a box in which 8–10 frames are hung.   Western honeybees collect nectar and store the processed nectar in honeycomb, which they build on the frames.  When the honeycomb is full, the bees will reduce the moisture content of the honey to 17-18% moisture content before capping the comb with beeswax.

Beekeepers will take the full honey supers and extract the honey.  Periods when there is an abundant nectar source available and bees are quickly bringing back the nectar, are called a honey flow.  During a honey flow, beekeepers may put several honey supers onto a hive so the bees have enough storage space.

Honey supers are removed in the fall when the honey is extracted, and before the hive is winterized, but enough honey is left for the bees to consume during winter.

Langstroth hive dimensions 

Using  inch wood the outside dimensions are 19" × 16" × height. In the metric system 25mm wood may be used which makes the outside dimensions 515mm × 425mm × height.

References

External links 
 

Beekeeping tools
Buildings and structures used to confine animals